Gualtiero De Angelis (November 22, 1899 – June 6, 1980) was an Italian actor and voice actor. He was best known for dubbing James Stewart in the Italian language releases of nearly all of his films.

Biography 
Born in Rome, De Angelis began his career in 1936. During that time, he starred in over nine films and dubbed over the voices of many famous actors. He was the official Italian voice of James Stewart as well as Cary Grant, Dean Martin and Errol Flynn. He also dubbed over the voices of John Garfield, George Raft, Richard Conte, Kirk Douglas, Paul Henreid, Henry Fonda, Gary Merrill, John Wayne, Arthur Kennedy, William Holden and many more. He has also dubbed over Italian actors such as Vittorio Gassman, Luciano Tajoli and Pietro Germi.

De Angelis was considered to be among the most influential voice dubbers employed with the Cooperativa Doppiatori Cinematografici along with Emilio Cigoli, Lydia Simoneschi, Lauro Gazzolo, Carlo Romano, Giulio Panicali, Stefano Sibaldi, Bruno Persa and more.

Personal life 
De Angelis was the patriarch of the historic De Angelis family which are well known for dubbing voices. He was the father of voice actor Manlio De Angelis (1935–2017), singer Enrico De Angelis (1920–2018) and Paola De Angelis. He also had three grandchildren: Vittorio De Angelis (1962–2015; via Manlio), Eleonora De Angelis (born 1967; via Manlio) and Massimiliano Virgilii (born 1967; via Paola) who are all voice actors.

Death 
De Angelis died on June 6, 1980 in Rome at the age of 80. He was later laid to rest at the Cimitero Flaminio.

Filmography

Cinema
 Arditi civili (1940)
 Piccolo re (1940)
 Vento di milioni (1940)
 Big Shoes (1940)
 Il segreto di Villa Paradiso (1940)
 Beatrice Cenci (1941)
 Love Story (1942)
 Vortice (1953)
 La grande avventura (1954)

Dubbing roles

Live action

References

External links 
 
 

1899 births
1980 deaths
Male actors from Rome
Italian male voice actors
Italian male film actors
Italian male television actors
20th-century Italian male actors
Burials at the Cimitero Flaminio